Lebogang James Motlhaping (born 23 November 1971) is a South African politician from the Northern Cape. He was the Member of the Executive Council for Transport, Safety and Liaison from 2018 to 2019, the MEC for Health from 2016 to 2018, and the MEC for Sports, Arts and Culture from 2014 to 2016. He was a Member of the Northern Cape Provincial Legislature from 2014 to 2019. Motlhaping is a member of the African National Congress.

Early life and education
Lebogang James Motlhaping was born on 23 November 1971 in Kuruman in the previous Cape Province. He attended high school in Loopeng in the Bophuthatswana bantustan. He then studied at the North-West University, where he obtained a community development certificate. He received a leadership certificate at the African Political Parties School. In 1996, he achieved a certificate in ethics management from PALAMA. Motlhaping is currently studying towards a degree in public administration from MANCOSA.

Career
While teaching at Bosheng Middle School, he organised for the Congress of South African Students from 1990 to 1996. He served as a member of the Black Rock Development Forum between 1995 and 1999. At the same time, he served as a district coordinator for the Mmabatho Adult Literacy and Education Trust. From 1998 to 2001, he worked as a provincial coordinator at ABET.

Motlhaping worked for Statistics South Africa between 2001 and 2002. From 2002 to 2005, he served as the regional secretary for the Kgalagadi Youth Council. He was a manager of the Kgalagadi Human Resource Development Foundation between 2004 and 2008. In 2008, he became a Mayoral Committee Member of the John Taolo Gaetsewe District Municipality. He held the post until 2010. Motlhaping was the district chairperson of the Home Affairs Forum between 2009 and 2012.

Provincial government
Motlhaping was sworn in as a Member of the Northern Cape Provincial Legislature  following the May 2014 provincial election. On 30 May, premier Sylvia Lucas appointed him Member of the Executive Council for Sports, Arts and Culture, succeeding Pauline Williams. Motlhaping served in the post until 2 March 2016, when Lucas moved him to the Health portfolio of the Executive Council. He succeeded Mac Jack, while Bongiwe Mbinqo-Gigaba succeeded him. On 15 February 2018, Motlhaping became the MEC for Transport, Safety and Liaison. He held this post until the 2019 general election, when he left the provincial legislature. Newly elected premier Zamani Saul appointed him the chief of staff in his office in December 2019.

References

External links

Living people
1971 births
Tswana people
People from Ga-Segonyana Local Municipality
African National Congress politicians
Members of the Northern Cape Provincial Legislature
21st-century South African politicians